Orphée [ɔrfeə] (Orpheus) is an opera by the French composer Louis Lully, with contributions from his brother Jean-Baptiste Lully the Younger. It was first performed at the Académie Royale de Musique (the Paris Opera) on 21 February 1690. It takes the form of a tragédie en musique in three acts and a prologue. The libretto is by Michel Duboullay. This opera was created as a satirical response to Louis Lully's father's tragicomedie et ballet, "Ballet de Psyche," which proclaimed the greatness of King Louis XIV's power and the calm that occurred because of his reign. Louis Lully chose the story of Orpheus in relation to the monarch as a commentary on the villainous tendencies of his rule of France.

Prologue
The audience sees an empty theatre with the back Portico showing the raging of a cold winter's night. Venus, the goddess of Love and mother of Orpheus, comes in front of the audience and shows her disapproval for 'useless pomp' and the horrors of War, referencing the Nine Years' War, which as of 1690, has now entered its third year. She laments her son, Orpheus, although the state of her son is unclear from the description provided. The 'Games and Pleasures' (unclear what is being referenced by the description) make their appearance on stage, as well as Cupid and Charites (The Graces).

Sources
  Libretto at "Livres baroques"
 Félix Clément and Pierre Larousse Dictionnaire des Opéras, Paris, 1881, page 502.
 https://books.google.com/books?id=qxiHDQAAQBAJ&pg=PT150&lpg=PT150&dq=Louis+de+Lully+Orphee&source=bl&ots=Dd2kD_0bTM&sig=ACfU3U3SzuBdo3KDq2hEd5dWuk_B54bB7A&hl=en&sa=X&ved=2ahUKEwj8jfPylrnpAhXUl3IEHX2GA3cQ6AEwFnoECCIQAQ#v=onepage&q=Louis%20de%20Lully%20Orphee&f=false], search the words 'Louis de Lully Orphee'
[Louis XIV and the Land of Love and Adventure: 1679 to 1699, by K. F. Oelke] https://books.google.com/books?id=542dDwAAQBAJ&pg=PT218&lpg=PT218&dq=Louis+de+Lully+Orphee&source=bl&ots=s6oYy5lYRL&sig=ACfU3U1veE5IiMzIzCO9JQsHuHC2Tuih8Q&hl=en&sa=X&ved=2ahUKEwj8jfPylrnpAhXUl3IEHX2GA3cQ6AEwHHoECCEQAQ#v=onepage&q=Louis%20de%20Lully%20Orphee&f=false, search the words 'Louis de Lully Orphee'
[Sheet music, https://imslp.org/wiki/Orph%C3%A9e_(Lully,_Louis)]

French-language operas
Tragédies en musique
Operas
1690 operas
Operas about Orpheus